In enzymology, a [myelin basic protein]-arginine N-methyltransferase is an enzyme that catalyzes the chemical reaction

S-adenosyl-L-methionine + [myelin basic protein]-arginine  S-adenosyl-L-homocysteine + [myelin basic protein]-Nomega-methyl-arginine

Thus, the two substrates of this enzyme are S-adenosyl methionine and myelin basic protein-arginine, whereas its two products are S-adenosylhomocysteine and myelin basic protein-Nomega-methyl-arginine.

This enzyme belongs to the family of transferases, specifically those transferring one-carbon group methyltransferases.  The systematic name of this enzyme class is S-adenosyl-L-methionine:[myelin-basic-protein]-arginine Nomega-methyltransferase. Other names in common use include myelin basic protein methylase I, protein methylase I, S-adenosyl-L-methionine:[myelin-basic-protein]-arginine, and omega-N-methyltransferase.

References

 

EC 2.1.1
Enzymes of unknown structure